WDTL (105.7 FM, "Delta Country 105.7") is a radio station licensed to serve Indianola, Mississippi, United States. The station is owned by Delta Radio Network LLC.

WDTL broadcasts a country music format to the greater Greenville, Mississippi, area. Notable programming includes a syndicated morning show hosted by Moby in the Morning.  The station also airs the syndicated "The Original Country Gold with Rowdy Yates" and "Rick Jackson's Country Classics."

History
In August 1984, Fritts Broadcasting, Inc., reached an agreement to sell this station to Shamrock Broadcasting, Inc. The deal was approved by the U.S. Federal Communications Commission (FCC) on October 9, 1984, and the transaction was consummated on October 15, 1984.

In April 2007, Shamrock Broadcasting, Inc., contracted to sell this station and AM sister station WNLA to Debut Broadcasting Corporation, Inc. The deal was approved by the FCC in May 2007 and the transaction consummated in June 2007.  Debut sold the station to Delta Radio Network in 2010.

On September 16, 2014, the then-WNOU changed its format from urban contemporary to country, branded as "Delta Country 105.5". The station changed its call sign to the current WDTL on March 9, 2016.

References

External links 

 Debut Broadcasting Corporation
 

DTL
Sunflower County, Mississippi
Radio stations established in 1969
1969 establishments in Mississippi